The Barbados Amateur Basketball Association (BABA) is the governing and licensing body for amateur basketball in Barbados.

History 
BABA was founded in 1934. Its mission is to supervise and regulate the playing of amateur basketball in Barbados as intended by FIBA. BABA oversees the selection and organization of national teams for men and women for representation internationally; eligibility is determined by nationality status or Barbadian parentage. 

BABA was recognized by FIBA in 1962, and joined the Caribbean Basketball Confederation (CBC) in 1981.

Today 
The BABA is currently managed by president Francis Williams and secretary general Charlene Georgina Leacock.

References 

1934 establishments in Barbados
Sports organizations established in 1934
Basketball in Barbados
Basketball governing bodies in North America
FIBA